RTV 7 Tuzla is a local Bosnian  public cable television channel based in city of Tuzla. It was established in 2012.

RTV 7 broadcasts a variety of programs such as local news, local sports, mosaic and documentaries. The programming is mainly produced in the Bosnian language.

Radio Tuzla is also part of public municipality services.

References

External links 
 Official website of RTV 7 Tuzla
 Communications Regulatory Agency of Bosnia and Herzegovina

Television channels and stations established in 2012
Television stations in Bosnia and Herzegovina

Mass media in Tuzla